Tom Fry is an Australian professional vert skater. Fry started skating when he was seventeen years old in 1991 and turned professional in 1995. Fry has won many competitions in his vert skating career.

Vert Competitions 
1996 X Games, Second Place Vert 
1996 ASA Vancouver, Second Place Vert 
1996 Lausanne Swatch Aggressive, Third Place Vert 
1996 Lausanne Swatch Aggressive, Tenth Place Street 
1995 Destination Extreme, New York, Second Place Vert 
1995 X Games, Rhode Island, Vert: 1st
1995 Lausanne World Finals, Second Place Vert 
1994 NISS World Championships, Second Place Street 
1994 NISS World Championships, Second Place Vert 
1994 Australian Championship, First Place

References

External links
archive.org
wheelscene.co.uk
skatelog.com

Vert skaters
1974 births
Living people
X Games athletes